= Leonard Rosmarin =

Leonard Rosmarin (born in Montreal, Quebec) is a Canadian professor of French literature and a novelist. He is the former Chair of the Department of Modern Languages at Brock University in St. Catharines, Ontario.

Rosmarin is a specialist of seventeenth century French literature, and links between opera and literature.

== Biography ==
Rosmarin earned a doctorate from Yale University where he began his teaching career in 1964. He became assistant professor at Wesleyan University, also in Connecticut.

In 1969, he returned to Canada to take up a position as associate, then full professor at Brock University.

Rosmarin has been decorated twice by the Government of France for distinguished service in the cause of French letters.

== Books ==
- Elie Wiesel ou le refus du désespoir, Editions du Grand-Pré, 2011 (book never published: publisher went bankrupt)
- Getting Enough, Strategic Book Publishing, 2009, ISBN 978-1606934104
- Liliane Atlan ou la quête de la forme divine, L'Harmattan : Editions du Gref, 2004
- When Literature becomes Opera : Study of a Transformational Process, Rodopi Bv Editions, 1999, ISBN 978-9042006942
- Robert Pinget, Twayne publishers, 1995, ISBN 978-0805745375
- Exilés, marginaux et parias dans les littératures francophones, L'Harmattan : Editions du Gref, 1994
- Albert Cohen, témoin d'un peuple, Editions du Grand-Pré, 1992
- Emmanuel Levinas, humaniste de l'autre homme, L'Harmattan : Editions du Gref, 1991, ISBN 978-0921916130
- Saint-Evremond, artiste de l'euphorie, Summa publications, 1987, ISBN 978-0917786525
